The Thai city of Chiang Mai is planning a light rail system, with an aimed 2027 opening. The Mass Rapid Transit Authority of Thailand (MRTA) announced that the bidding process for a tram network in Chiang Mai could begin in 2020. The 35 km tramway, both above and below ground, is estimated to cost 86 billion baht. It is projected that the first of three lines could break ground in 2021, and the system could be operational by roughly 2027.

Lines

Red Line

Blue Line
The  Blue Line will run from Chiang Mai Zoo in the west of the municipality to Don Chan district in the south.  will be at-grade and  will be underground.

Green Line
The  Green Line will run from the city's northeast area and head southward to Chiang Mai airport.  will be at-grade and  will be underground.

See also
 Phuket Island light rail transit
 Khon Kaen Light Rail Transit
 List of urban rail systems in Thailand

References

Rail transport in Thailand
Proposed rail infrastructure in Thailand
Light railways
2027 in rail transport